Fallen Empire or Fallen Empires may refer to:

Film
Fallen Empire (film), 2012 film by Alejo Mo-Sun

Games
Fallen Empires (Magic: The Gathering), a Magic: The Gathering expansion set
Fallen Empire, renamed Legions: Overdrive, a 2010 computer game
Fallen Empires (2019), an upcoming real-time-strategy game on Steam

Music
Fallen Empires (album), a 2011 album by Snow Patrol, or the title song
Fallen Empires Tour
The Fallen Empire, a 2006 album by Altaria
The Fallen Empires, Swedish band
Fallen Empires, a 2010 album by Our Last Enemy
Fallen Empires, a 2015 album by Diviner